"Forgive" is a song co-written and recorded by American country music singer Rebecca Lynn Howard.  It was released in May 2002 as the only single and title track from her album Forgive, and the only Top 40 country hit of her career.  The song peaked at number 12 on Billboard Hot Country Singles & Tracks chart.  The song is also featured on the soundtrack to NBC drama series Providence.  Howard wrote the song with Trey Bruce, who co-produced it with Mark Wright.

Music video
The music video was directed by Morgan Lawley and premiered in mid-2002.

Critical reception
Maria Konicki Dinoia of Allmusic called the song "chill-inducing" and a "masterpiece" in her review of the album.

Chart positions
"Forgive" debuted at number 56 on the Billboard Hot Country Singles & Tracks chart dated May 11, 2002 and spent 30 weeks on the chart.

Year-end charts

References 

2002 singles
Rebecca Lynn Howard songs
Songs written by Trey Bruce
MCA Nashville Records singles
Song recordings produced by Mark Wright (record producer)